Brandon Mitchell (born October 26, 1983) is a former American football safety.

Mitchell played high school football at Benjamin E. Mays High School in Atlanta. He played college football at Ohio State and was signed by the Houston Texans as an undrafted free agent in 2007.

External links
Cleveland Browns biography
Houston Texans biography

1983 births
Living people
Players of American football from Atlanta
American football safeties
Ohio State Buckeyes football players
Houston Texans players
Cleveland Browns players
Ohio State University Moritz College of Law alumni